Ernesto Beren (born 28 February 1950) is a Filipino gymnast. He competed in four events at the 1968 Summer Olympics.

References

External links
 

1950 births
Living people
Filipino male artistic gymnasts
Olympic gymnasts of the Philippines
Gymnasts at the 1968 Summer Olympics